Louis Emmanuel Dupaty (31 July 1775 – 30 July 1851) was a French playwright, naval officer, chansonnier, journalist and administrator of the Bibliothèque de l'Arsenal. His brother was the sculptor Louis Dupaty.

Works 
Theatre

 Figaro, directeur des marionnettes, comédie en 1 acte et en prose, mêlée de vaudevilles et d'ariettes, Paris, théâtre du Palais-Royal, 31 décembre 1784
 Arlequin journaliste, comédie en 1 acte, en prose, mêlée de vaudevilles, Paris, Théâtre du Vaudeville, 22 frimaire an VI (1797) Text on line
 L'Opéra-comique, opéra-comique en 1 acte, en prose et ariettes, Paris, Opéra-comique, 21 messidor an VI (1797)
 Les Français à Cythère, comédie en 1 acte, en prose, mêlée de vaudevilles, Paris, Vaudeville, 17 March 1798
 Le Chapitre second, comédie en un acte, Paris, Opéra-Comique, 29 prairial an 7 (1798)
 Le Déménagement du salon, ou le Portrait de Gilles, comédie-parade en 1 acte et en vaudevilles, Paris, Théâtre du Vaudeville, 25 vendémiaire an VII
 Arlequin tout seul, comédie-monologue en prose et vaudevilles, Paris, Théâtre du Vaudeville, 14 frimaire an VII (1798)
 Le Buste de Préville, impromptu en 1 acte et en prose, Paris, Théâtre de la République, 25 nivôse an VIII (1799)
 La Girouette de Saint-Cloud, impromptu en 1 acte, en prose, mêlé de vaudevilles, Paris, Théâtre du Vaudeville, 23 brumaire an VIII (1799)
 D'auberge en auberge, ou les Préventions, comédie en 3 actes, Paris, Opéra-Comique, 26 April 1800
 Sophie, ou la Malade qui se porte bien, comédie en 3 actes, mêlée de vaudevilles, Paris, Théâtre du Vaudeville, 8 February 1802
 L'Antichambre ou les Valets maîtres, opéra comique in one act and in prose, music by Nicolas Dalayrac, 27 February 1802 (8 ventôse an X) Opéra-Comique (Théâtre Feydeau)
 Picaros et Diego ou la Folle Soirée, opéra comique in one act and in prose, music by Nicolas Dalayrac, [revival of L'Antichambre], created 3 May 1803 (13 floréal an XI) at the Opéra-Comique (Théâtre Feydeau)
 La Prison militaire, ou les Trois prisonniers, comédie en 5 actes et en prose, Paris, Théâtre Louvois, 18 July 1803
 La Jeune Prude ou les Femmes entre elles, comedy in act and in prose mingled with ariettes, music by Nicolas Dalayrac, created at the Opéra-Comique (Théâtre Feydeau), 14 January 1804 (3 nivôse an XI)
 Les Deux Pères ou la leçon de botanique, comédie en 2 actes mêlée de vaudevilles, Paris, Théâtre du Vaudeville, 4 June 1804
 Ossian cadet, ou les Guimbardes, parodie des "Bardes", vaudeville en 3 petits actes qui n'en font qu'un, Paris, Théâtre du Vaudeville, 11 thermidor an XII (July 1804)
 Les Vélocifères, comédie-parade en 1 acte, mêlée de vaudevilles, Paris, Théâtre du Vaudeville, 29 floréal an 12 (1804)
 Les Femmes colères, divertissement en 1 acte, en prose, mêlé de vaudevilles, Paris, Théâtre du Vaudeville, 11 February 1805
 Le Lendemain de la pièce tombée, comédie en 1 acte, mêlée de vaudevilles, Paris, Théâtre du Vaudeville, 13 fructidor an XIII (1805)
 L'Intrigue aux fenêtres, opéra bouffon en 1 acte, Paris, Opéra-comique, 6 ventôse an XIII (1805)
 Le Jaloux malade, comédie en 1 acte et en prose, mêlée de vaudevilles, Paris, Théâtre du Vaudeville, 9 pluviôse an XIII (1805)
 Une matinée du Pont-Neuf, divertissement-parade en 1 acte, mêlé de vaudevilles, Paris, Théâtre du Vaudeville, January 1806
 L'Amant par vanité, ou le Père rival, comédie en 3 actes et en vers, Paris, Théâtre de l'Impératrice, 9 April 1806
 Agnès Sorel, comédie en 3 actes, mêlée de vaudevilles, Paris, Théâtre du Vaudeville, 19 April 1806
 La Jeune mère, ou les Acteurs de société, comédie en 2 actes, mêlée de vaudevilles, Paris, Théâtre du Vaudeville, 4 brumaire an XIV (October 1806)
 Le Séducteur en voyage, ou les voitures versées, comédie en 2 actes, mêlée de vaudevilles, Paris, Théâtre du Vaudeville, 4 December 1806
 Mademoiselle de Guise, opéra-comique en 3 actes, Paris, Opéra-comique, 17 March 1808
 Ninon chez Madame de Sévigné, comédie en 1 acte et en vers, mêlée de chants, Paris, Opéra-comique, 26 September 1808
 Françoise de Foix, opéra-comique en 3 actes, Paris, Opéra-comique, 28 January 1809
 Cagliostro ou la Séduction, opéra-comique en trois actes, Paris, Opéra-comique, 27 September 1810
 Le Poète et le Musicien ou Je cherche un sujet, comedy in three acts and in vers mingled with song, Dupaty added a prologue in free verse in honour to Dalayrac, music by Nicolas Dalayrac, created at the Opéra-Comique (Théâtre Feydeau), 30 May 1811
 La Petite revue lyonnaise, ou Fanchon la vielleuse à Lyon, comédie-vaudeville impromptu en 1 acte, Lyon, Théâtre des Célestins, 7, 8, 9 and 10 November 1811
 Avis aux mères, ou les Deux fêtes, comédie en 1 acte et en vers, Paris, Théâtre-Français, 14 January 1813
 Le Camp de Sobieski, ou le Triomphe des femmes, comédie en 2 actes et en vers, mêlée de chant, Paris, Opéra-comique, 21 April 1813
 Bayard à Mézières, opéra-comique en 1 acte, Paris, Opéra-comique, 12 February 1814
 Félicie, ou la Jeune fille romanesque, opéra-comique en 3 actes et en prose, Paris, Opéra-comique, 28 February 1815
 Les Voitures versées, opéra-comique en 2 actes, Paris, Opéra-comique, 29 April 182?
 Un dernier jour de fortune, comédie-vaudeville en 1 acte, Paris, Théâtre du Gymnase, 11 November 1823
Divers
 Les Délateurs, ou Trois années du dix-neuvième siècle (1819)
 L'Art poétique des demoiselles et des jeunes gens, ou Lettres à Isaure sur la poésie, Première partie comprenant l'histoire de la poésie et des poètes anciens (1824)

External links 
Académie française
 Emmanuel Dupaty on Data.bnf.fr

1775 births
1851 deaths
People from Gironde
French male singers
French Navy officers
19th-century French journalists
French male journalists
French librarians
French chansonniers
18th-century French dramatists and playwrights
19th-century French dramatists and playwrights
Members of the Académie Française
19th-century French male writers
18th-century French male writers
French male singer-songwriters